Lena Lauzemis (born 15 January 1983) is a German actress.  She has been in multiple films and television shows including If Not Us, Who?, Die Hitlerkantate, Wolffs Revier and Tatort.  She has also been a regular performer with the Munich Kammerspiele.

Selected filmography
 If Not Us, Who? (2011)
 The Chambermaid Lynn (2014) – Chiara
 Deutschland 83 (2015) – Nina
 A Heavy Heart (2015) – Sandra
  (2016) – Lisa Sokulowa

External links
 

German film actresses
1983 births
German television actresses
Living people